NGC 2002 (also known as ESO 86-SC3) is an open cluster located in the Dorado constellation and is part of the Large Magellanic Cloud. It was discovered by James Dunlop on September 24, 1826. Its apparent magnitude is 10.1, and its size is 2.0 arc minutes.

NGC 2002 contains five red supergiants, prominent in deep images of the cluster.  Together with the main sequence turnoff, these tightly constrain the age of the cluster to 18 million years.  The cluster shows strong stellar stratification with the brightest stars concentrated at the centre of the cluster and fainter stars dominating further out.

References

External links
 

Open clusters
2002
ESO objects
Dorado (constellation)
Large Magellanic Cloud
Astronomical objects discovered in 1826
Discoveries by James Dunlop